Dimeh-ye Karim (also Romanized as Dīmeh-ye Karīm; also known as Dīmeh) is a village in Howmeh-ye Gharbi Rural District, in the Central District of Ramhormoz County, Khuzestan Province, Iran. At the 2006 census, its population was 41, in 7 families.

References 

Populated places in Ramhormoz County